Gandharva is a mythological creature in Hinduism and Buddhism.

Gandharva may also refer to:

Surname

Bal Gandharva (1888–1967), one of the greatest theatre personalities of the early 20th Century.
Sawai Gandharva, a Hindustani classical vocalist
Kumar Gandharva, a Hindustani Classical vocalist

Other uses
Gandharva marriage,  a historic marriage tradition from the Indian subcontinent
Gandharva (album), a 1971 electronica album by Beaver & Krause
The Gandharvas, a rock band from Canada
Gandharva Mahavidyalaya (established 1939), a music school in New Delhi
Gandarbha, an ethnic group in Nepal
Gandharv, a Hindu community in North India
Gandharva (film), a 1992 Kannada film starring Soundarya

See also
 Ganadhara, a concept in Jainism
 Gandarbha, a Dalit community from central Nepal
 Gandarvakottai, in Tamil Nadu, India
 Gandhara (disambiguation)